Speed Six may refer to:
Bentley Speed Six, British sports car produced between 1926 and 1930
Ruger Speed-Six, American revolver produced between 1972 and 1988
Speed Six!, children's book by Richard Hough (aka Bruce Carter)
TVR Speed Six engine, British car engine produced between 1999 and 2007